Hurffville is an unincorporated community within Washington Township, in Gloucester County, New Jersey, United States. Hurffville got its name from the Hurff family, one of the early settlers to the township.

Hurffville School is an elementary school in Hurffville and is one of the oldest schools in the Washington Township Public School District.

References

Washington Township, Gloucester County, New Jersey
Unincorporated communities in Gloucester County, New Jersey
Unincorporated communities in New Jersey